Uladzimir Bushma (born 24 November 1983) is a Belarusian professional footballer who plays for Rogachev.

Honours
Gomel
Belarusian Cup winner: 2010–11
Belarusian Super Cup winner: 2012

Minsk
Belarusian Cup winner: 2012–13

External links

1983 births
Living people
Footballers from Minsk
Belarusian footballers
Association football goalkeepers
FC Torpedo-BelAZ Zhodino players
FC Gomel players
FC Minsk players
FC Shakhtyor Soligorsk players
FC Dnepr Rogachev players